Roger Tuivasa-Sheck (born 5 June 1993) is a New Zealand rugby union player, and former rugby league footballer. He plays for the Auckland Blues in the Super Rugby Pacific, and for the New Zealand national team. He made his debut against Ireland on 16th July, 2022.

In 2018 Tuivasa-Sheck became the first Warriors player to win the Dally M Medal. He also played for the Sydney Roosters in the National Rugby League, with whom he won a premiership in 2013, playing on the wing.

Background
Tuivasa-Sheck was born in Apia, Samoa. He attended Otahuhu College in Auckland, where he played both rugby union and rugby league. Tuivasa-Sheck represented the New Zealand rugby union schoolboy team and captained Otahuhu College at the New Zealand Rugby League's Secondary Schools tournament in 2011 before being signed by the Sydney Roosters in October of that year.

Tuivasa-Sheck is the older brother of Johnny Tuivasa-Sheck who played for the Roosters premiership-winning Under 20s & reserve grade sides before joining Roger at the Warriors & turning out for the NZ club's reserve grade side.

Playing career

2012
Tuivasa-Sheck played for the Roosters' NYC team in 2012 and scored 9 tries in 12 games before moving on to their New South Wales Cup reserve-grade team. 

In round 21 of the 2012 NRL season, Tuivasa-Sheck made his NRL debut on the wing in the Roosters' 36-16 loss against the Gold Coast Titans at the SFS. Tuivasa-Sheck finished his debut year with 6 matches. He was named at wing in the 2012 Toyota Cup Team of the Year. In September, Tuivasa-Sheck was featured in an article listing the top ten upcoming talents of the NRL.

On 2 October, Tuivasa-Sheck was named in the Junior Kiwis team to face the Junior Kangaroos. He was named the New Zealand Rugby League's 2012 Junior of the Year. On 21 December, Tuivasa-Sheck extended his contract for a further three years, keeping him at the Roosters till the end of the 2015 season.

2013
In round 4, against Parramatta Eels at the SFS, Tuivasa-Sheck scored his first tries in first grade completing a hat-trick in the Roosters' 50-0 win. On 1 October, he was named Winger of the Year at the Dally M Awards. On 6 October 2013, Tuivasa-Sheck was part of the team that beat the Manly-Warringah Sea Eagles 26-18 for the 2013 NRL Premiership. Tuivasa-Sheck played in 25 matches and scored 9 tries for the Roosters in the 2013.

Playing for the Kiwis in the 2013 Rugby League World Cup, Tuivasa-Sheck made his international debut against Samoa in the 42-24 win at Halliwell Jones Stadium. In the final, against Australia, he injured his leg early in the match and the Kiwis lost 2-34 at Old Trafford. Tuivasa-Sheck played 6 matches and scored 8 tries in the tournament.

2014
Tuivasa-Sheck played on the wing for New Zealand in the 2014 Anzac Test, with the Kiwis losing 30-18. He finished the Roosters' season with 7 tries from 26 matches.

2015
In the pre-season, Tuivasa-Sheck played for the Roosters in the Auckland Nines. On 8 April, he signed a 3-year contract with the New Zealand Warriors starting in 2016, replacing the departing Sam Tomkins. On 3 May, he played for the Kiwis at fullback in their historic 2015 Anzac Test victory over Australia. It was only the Kiwis' second win in the 15 editions of the annual test-match since its introduction in 1997. During the season, Tuivasa-Sheck ran a combined 5767 metres. On 29 September, he was named the 2015 Dally M Fullback of the Year, finishing his last year with the Roosters having played in all of their 27 matches and scoring 12 tries. He returned to the Kiwis side at the end of the year to play in their tour of Great Britain. He played in all 3 matches and scored 1 try against England in the Kiwis' 2-1 Baskerville Shield series loss.

2016
In February, Tuivasa-Sheck played for the Warriors in the Auckland Nines. In Round 1 of the season, he made his club debut for the Warriors against the Wests Tigers, playing at fullback in the Warriors' 26-34 loss at Campbelltown Stadium. In round five, in his first game against his old club the Roosters, he combined with Tuimoala Lolohea to score the match-winning try that gave the Warriors a 32-28 victory in golden point. In Round 7 against the Canterbury-Bankstown Bulldogs, he suffered a season ending anterior cruciate ligament (ACL) knee injury. This meant he finished the 2016 season having played in 7 matches and scoring 1 try for the Warriors.

2017
On 1 February, new coach Stephen Kearney named Tuivasa-Sheck as the Warriors new captain.

2018
On the 26th of September, Tuivasa-Sheck was named “Fullback of The Year” and the “Dally M” Medalist of the Year at the 2018 “Dally M Awards”. He became the first New Zealand Warriors player to receive this honour.
Tuivasa-Sheck finished the season scoring just 3 tries and playing in 23 games for the Warriors.

2019
Tuivasa-Sheck made 23 appearances scoring 7 tries in the 2019 NRL season as New Zealand finished a disappointing 13th and missed out on the finals.

2020
In round 16 of the 2020 NRL season, he scored two tries in a 36-6 victory over Newcastle at Scully Park in Tamworth.

He made a total of 18 appearances for New Zealand in the 2020 NRL season as the club missed out on the finals.

2021
On 30 January, it was announced that he would be leaving the New Zealand Warriors and the National Rugby League itself, at the end of the 2021 season, to sign a contract with the New Zealand Rugby Union in a bid to play for the All Blacks (New Zealand National Rugby Team).

On 6 February, Tuivasa-Sheck signed a two-year contract with the Blues from the 2022 season, and will also play for Auckland in the Mitre 10 Cup.

On 26 July, it was announced that Tuivasa-Sheck would leave the club immediately to go home to New Zealand before the Trans-Tasman travel bubble was closed.

2022
Tuivasa-Sheck started for the Blues in February that year, against the Hurricanes. He was named in the All Blacks squad for their test series against Ireland and debuted on 16 July 2022 at Wellington.

Personal life
In May 2015, Tuivasa-Sheck was first to the scene where a car crashed into a house near his home in the Sydney suburb of Botany. He rescued a man from the car, and stayed with the occupants of the house in question until medical services were able to arrive.

References

External links 

 

 Roger Tuivasa-Sheck | Rugby Database Profile
 

1993 births
New Zealand rugby league players
New Zealand sportspeople of Samoan descent
New Zealand national rugby league team players
Sydney Roosters players
New Zealand Warriors players
New Zealand Warriors captains
Newtown Jets NSW Cup players
Junior Kiwis players
Rugby league fullbacks
Rugby league wingers
People educated at Otahuhu College
Sportspeople from Apia
Living people
New Zealand rugby union players
Rugby union centres
Rugby union wings
Auckland rugby union players
Blues (Super Rugby) players
New Zealand international rugby union players